Idia terrebralis is a species of litter moth of the family Erebidae first described by William Barnes and James Halliday McDunnough in 1912. It is found in North America, including Illinois.

References

Herminiinae
Taxa named by William Barnes (entomologist)
Taxa named by James Halliday McDunnough
Moths described in 1912